The Calipt'Air Vectis is a Swiss single-place, paraglider that was designed and produced by Calipt'Air of Spiez. It is now out of production.

Design and development
The Vectis was designed as a performance intermediate and competition glider. The models are each named for their relative size.

Operational history
Reviewer Noel Bertrand described the Vectis in a 2003 review as the company's "top of the range wing".

Variants
Vectis S
Small-sized model for lighter pilots. The glider model is DHV 2 certified.
Vectis M
Mid-sized model for medium-weight pilots. The glider model is DHV 2 certified.
Vectis L
Large-sized model for heavier pilots. The glider model is DHV 2 certified.

Specifications (Vectis L)

References

Vectis
Paragliders